Taguatinga Sul is a Federal District Metro brazilian station on Orange line. It was opened on 31 March 2001 on the inaugural section of the line, from Central to Terminal Samambaia. It is located between Águas Claras and Furnas.

References

Brasília Metro stations
2001 establishments in Brazil
Railway stations opened in 2001